Panaqolus nix is a species of catfish in the family Loricariidae. It is native to South America, where it occurs in the Madeira River and the Mamoré River in Brazil, as well as the Madre de Dios River drainage basin in Peru. It is reported to have been caught in cofferdams at hydroelectric power plant construction sites in the Madeira River, with most specimens being collected at depths of 3.1 to 11 m (10 to 36 ft) in environments with a strong current. The species reaches 11.2 cm (4.4 inches) SL and is known to be quite variable in color. Its specific epithet, nix, derives from the Latin word for "snow", referring both to the species' characteristic white spots that are said to resemble snowflakes and the tendency of some individuals to be entirely pale.

References 

Ancistrini
Catfish of South America